Frances was a convict ship that transported a single convict from Madras, India to Fremantle, Western Australia in 1859. The convict, Patrick McDonald or McDonnell, was a soldier convicted of an "unnatural crime" by court-martial at Rangoon, and sentenced to fourteen years' transportation. There were no pensioner guards or other passengers on the ship other than McDonald.

See also
List of convict ship voyages to Western Australia
Convict era of Western Australia

References

Convict ships to Western Australia